The Ministry of Ports and Aviation is Sri Lanka's organization responsible for the development and operation of the country's shipping, port and aviation activities.

Overview
The organization was founded in 2004. It is responsible for supervising the organizations activities, developing national policy, and participating in development of laws to support the industries.

References

External links
 Ministry of Ports and Aviation, Sri Lanka (official site)

Government ministries of Sri Lanka